Notommatidae is a family of rotifers in the order Ploima.

References 

  O'Reilly, M. (2001). Rotifera, in: Costello, M.J. et al. (Ed.) (2001). European register of marine species: a check-list of the marine species in Europe and a bibliography of guides to their identification. Collection Patrimoines Naturels, 50: pages 149-151

External links 
 
 

Ploima
Rotifer families
Taxa named by Philip Henry Gosse